"Sweet and Low" is a song by rock band Augustana and it is the first single from their second album Can't Love, Can't Hurt (2008). It was used in an episode of Kyle XY, which further gained attraction in late 2009 and early 2010. As of October 2021, the official music video on YouTube has over 1.4 million views. The video was posted on August 25, 2010.

Track listing
CD single
 "Sweet and Low"

"Sweet and Low (Live at Sweetwater Studios)"
 "Sweet and Low"

Charts

References

https://www.youtube.com/watch?v=aFrZHTNOmas

2008 singles
Augustana (band) songs
2008 songs
Epic Records singles
Song recordings produced by Warren Huart